Real Monasterio de Santa Inés del Valle (Royal Monastery of Saint Agnes of the Valley) is located in Écija, Province of Seville, Spain. The convent is served by Poor Clares. Founded in the late 15th century, its church is designed in Baroque style and dates to the early 17th century. Reports in 2002 stated that the building was in serious disrepair.

Gallery

References

External links
 

Convents in Spain
Monasteries in Andalusia
Roman Catholic churches in Seville
15th-century establishments in Spain
17th-century Roman Catholic church buildings in Spain
Baroque architecture in Andalusia
Écija
Organisations based in Spain with royal patronage